The Martin P5M Marlin (P-5 Marlin after 1962), built by the Glenn L. Martin Company of Middle River, Maryland, was a twin piston-engined flying boat that entered service in 1951, and served into the late 1960s with the United States Navy performing naval patrols. It also served with the United States Coast Guard and the French Navy. 285 were produced.

Development
Built as a successor to the PBM Mariner, it had better engines, an improved hull, and a single vertical fin tail. The XP5M Marlin prototypes were based on the last PBM-5 Mariners, the company designation being Model 237. The type was heavily improved, again leading to the P5M-2 (Model 237B), which was redesignated SP-5B. A number of P5M-1 models were also used for training, designated TP-5A (after 1962).

Design

The Marlin was designed as a gull-winged aircraft to place the engines and propellers high above the spray. Power was provided by two Wright R-3350 radial engines. The rear hull did not lift sharply from the water at the tail, instead rising up steadily, a Martin innovation; this gave the aircraft a longer base of flotation and reduced "porpoising" over waves.

The prototype had nose and tail turrets with twin  cannon in each, as well as a dorsal turret with two 0.5 in (12.7 mm) M2 Browning machine guns. The cockpit area was the same as the Mariner's. It first flew on 30 May 1948.

The first of 167 production P5M-1 aircraft was produced in 1951, flying on 22 June 1951. Changes from the prototype included a raised flight deck for improved visibility, the replacement of the nose turret with a large radome for the AN/APS-44 search radar, the deletion of the dorsal turret, and new, streamlined wing floats. The engine nacelles were lengthened to provide room for weapons bays in the rear.

The P5M-1 was followed by 116 P5M-2 planes. These had a T-tail to put the tail surfaces out of the spray, an AN/ASQ-8 MAD boom at the rear of the tail-tip, no tail guns (the gun position replaced by the antenna for the AN/APN-122 Doppler Navigation Set), better crew accommodation, and an improved bow to reduce spray during takeoff and landing.

Operational history

U.S. Navy
The last flying boat operations of the United States Navy were Market Time patrols of VP-40. Maritime surveillance patrols began in February 1965 to locate small craft transporting supplies from North Vietnam to Viet Cong units in South Vietnam. VP-40 operated from seaplane tenders and patrolled off the Mekong delta between Phú Quốc and Vung Tau. The last U.S. Navy P5M, redesignated as SP-5B, was flown to NAS Patuxent River, Maryland on 12 July 1968 for interim storage pending construction of display area at the Smithsonian Institution in Washington, D.C. As a display area at Smithsonian did not materialize, the aircraft was later relocated to the National Naval Aviation Museum at NAS Pensacola, Florida where it is currently on display.

The final Marlin flight was carried out by VP-40, to San Diego Bay on 6 November 1967.

U.S. Coast Guard
Seven P5M-1Gs and four P5M-2Gs were built for the United States Coast Guard for air-sea rescue service, but they found the planes difficult to maintain and surplus to requirements. They were subsequently transferred to the U.S. Navy, which redesignated them as TP-5As and used them as training aircraft, since they had no provision for armament.

French Navy
The French Navy took delivery of ten former U.S. Navy Marlins between 1957 and 1959 to replace Short Sunderlands in maritime patrol service, based in Dakar, Senegal in West Africa. They were returned in 1964.

Variants

Company designations
M-237 Company designation for P5M-1
M-237B Company designation for P5M-2
M-270 XP5M-1 prototype converted with a revised hull.
M-290 Company designation for P5M-3 which was completely revised into the unbuilt four-engine P7M SubMaster

Pre-1962 designations
XP5M-1
Prototype converted from a PBM Mariner with modified hull and tail.
P5M-1
Production model for the United States Navy, 160 built, later redesignated P-5A.
P5M-1G
Modified P5M-1 for the United States Coast Guard, seven conversions, later returned to the Navy as P5M-1T.
P5M-1S
Modified P5M-1 with upgraded electronic and anti-submarine equipment, eighty conversions, later redesignated SP-5A.
P5M-1T
Seven former USCG P5M-1Gs returned to Navy as crew trainers and one former P5M-1, later redesignated TP-5A.
P5M-2
Updated model, 108 built for the U.S. Navy and 12 built for the French Navy. The P5M-2 featured a T-tail in lieu of the low mounted horizontal stabilizer used on the P5M-1s. United States aircraft were later redesignated P-5B. 
P5M-2S
Most P5M-2s were modified with upgraded electronic and anti-submarine equipment, later redesignated SP-5B.
P5M-2G
Four P5M-2s built for the USCG, later transferred to U.S. Navy as P5M-2s.
P5M-3
Completely revised as four-engine M-313 P7M-1 SubMaster. Mockup built in 1956 but lost to Lockheed P-3 Orion.

Post-1962 designations
P-5A
P5M-1 redesignated in 1962.
SP-5A
P5M-1S redesignated in 1962.
TP-5A
P5M-1T redesignated in 1962.
P-5B
P5M-2 redesignated in 1962.
SP-5B
P5M-2S redesignated in 1962.

Operators
 France
French Navy

 United States
United States Coast Guard
United States Navy

Survivors
One SP-5B is located at the National Naval Aviation Museum at Naval Air Station Pensacola, Florida. This aircraft, BuNo 135533, is believed to be the last remaining example of the Marlin. It is now displayed inside the new hangar (as of the spring of 2010) and much of the exterior has been restored. The restoration is being financed by the museum and the Mariner/Marlin Association.

Specifications (P5M-2)

See also

References
Notes

Bibliography

Andrade, John, U.S.Military Aircraft Designations and Serials since 1909, Midland Counties Publications, 1979, .
Barth, Bruce D., "The Martin P5M 'Marlin'". Pacific Aero Press, 1994.
Roberts, Michael D. Dictionary of American Naval Aviation Squadrons: Volume 2 The History of VP, VPB, VP(HL) and VP(AM) Squadrons. Washington DC: Naval Historical Centre, 2000.
Swanborough, Gordon and Bowers, Peter M. United States Navy Aircraft since 1911. London:Putnam, Second edition 1976. .
The Illustrated Encyclopedia of Aircraft (Part Work 1982–1985), 1985, Orbis Publishing, Page 2420

External links

Naval Aviation Museum – Aircraft – 'P5M-2S (SP-5B) Marlin'

P5M
Martin PM5 Marlin
Flying boats
High-wing aircraft
Gull-wing aircraft
T-tail aircraft
Aircraft first flown in 1948
Twin piston-engined tractor aircraft